"How Can I Forget" was originally recorded as a love ballad by Motown group The Temptations in 1968 and was re-recorded in a psychedelic soul/funk styling by fellow Motown artist, Marvin Gaye in 1969. His version, released on Motown's first subsidiary, Tamla, became a modest hit that almost reached the Top 40 of the pop charts while peaking at number-eighteen on the Hot Selling Soul Singles chart in 1970. Marvin's recording was featured on his That's the Way Love Is album. The song is also notable for being (at the time) one of the shortest recordings for both The Tempts and for Gaye; recorded when most songs are over three minutes, its length is just under two.

Personnel

The Temptations' version
 Lead vocals by Paul Williams
 Background vocals by Eddie Kendricks, Melvin Franklin, and Otis Williams
 Instrumentation by The Funk Brothers

Marvin Gaye's version
Lead (and additional) background vocals by Marvin Gaye
Background vocals by The Originals: Freddie Gorman, Walter Gaines, Henry Dixon and C.P. Spencer
Instrumentation by The Funk Brothers and the Detroit Symphony Orchestra
Written by  Norman Whitfield and Barrett Strong
Produced by Norman Whitfield

References

1968 singles
1969 singles
The Temptations songs
Marvin Gaye songs
Motown singles
Songs written by Barrett Strong
Songs written by Norman Whitfield
Song recordings produced by Norman Whitfield
Gordy Records singles
Tamla Records singles
1968 songs